Margarita Khemlin (6 July 1960 – 24 October 2015) was a Jewish-Ukrainian novelist and short-story writer, best known for her novel Klotsvog.

Biography
Margarita Mikhailovna Khemlin was born in Chernihiv, in the Ukrainian SSR on 6 July 1960. Her father, Mikhail Khemlin was a foreman, while her mother, Vera Meyerovskaya, was a physiotherapy instructor. From 1980 to 1985, she studied at the Maxim Gorky Literature Institute in Moscow, under the supervision of Lev Ozerov.

Following her graduation, she worked variously in Housing and communal services, as a dishwasher, at the publisher Fizkultura i sport, as a theatre reviewer for the newspaper Nezavisimaya Gazeta (1990–1991), at the art department of the newspaper Today (1993–1996), as a political editor of the journal Itogi, and as chief editor in charge of promotion and design of the broadcaster Channel One Russia (1996–2003). The programme A Minute of Silence was revived under her aegis, following its stoppage between 1992–1995 after the fall of the Soviet Union.

Khemlin was married to the writer and translator Vardvan Varzhapetian.

Khemlin's first publication was the short story Illegal Hold (alternatively Sucker Punch) in the collection Sucker Punch: Sports Detective (issue 3, 1991, with Anatoly Belikov).

She published a cycle of short stories titled A Jewess' Farewell in the magazine Znamya (number 10), and won the Znamya prize for two of the stories (About Berta and About Iosif).

Her collection of short stories Queueing Area was short-listed for the Big Book prize in 2008. Her first novel, Klotsvog, was short listed for the Russian Booker prize in 2009, as was another novel The Investigator in 2013, which also won the Inspector NOSE prize for best post-Soviet detective book.

In 2012, Khemlin was appointed to the jury of the New York-based O'Henry Prize for short stories in the Russian language.

Khemlin died on 24 October 2015.

Selected works
 
  (with Alla Tsitrinyak)

English translations
 
 
 
Klotsvog. Translated by Lisa C. Hayden. New York: Columbia University Press, Russian Library series. 2019.

References

External links
 

1960 births
2015 deaths
People from Chernihiv
Ukrainian Jews
Russian women novelists
Ukrainian women novelists
Ukrainian women writers
Maxim Gorky Literature Institute alumni